De nostri temporis studiorum ratione is an oration by Gianbattista Vico first published in 1708.  The work's title is usually rendered in English as "On the Study Method of Our Times." Alternatively, scholars refer to the work as the De Ratione. Given the fact that it refers back to the Jesuit ratio studiorum, Vico's title may be most literally rendered as "The Method of the Studies of our Times." 

In his De Ratione, Vico sets out to compare classical/ancient learning (viz. the political-philosophical thought of pre-Christian Greece and Rome) and modernists (esp. modern jurisprudence, or modern readings of jus/right), drawing the reader's attention to what the two can learn from each other.

See also
 The New Science

Modern philosophical literature
1708 books